William Burnet (December 13, 1730 – October 7, 1791) was an American political leader and physician from New Jersey. He served in the Continental Army and the Continental Congress.

Biography
He was born on December 13, 1730 in Elizabeth, New Jersey.

Burnet graduated from Princeton University in 1749, studied medicine under Dr. Staats in White Plains, New York, and started his practice in Newark, New Jersey. He was a member of Newark's Committee of Safety in 1775 before he joined the Continental Army as a surgeon. He opened a hospital in Newark for wounded soldiers, and ran it throughout the Revolution. He was appointed Surgeon General for the Eastern Region in 1776, and also held that position until the war ended in 1783.

Burnet was elected to the Continental Congress in 1780 and served from December 11, 1780 until his resignation on April 1, 1781, when he was forced to leave this service by the press of other duties and his wife's illness. Later that year he began serving as  a judge in Essex County. He also led the New Jersey Medical Society in 1787. He was a member of The Society of the Cincinnati in the state of New Jersey, taking the seat of his brother Ichabod upon his death. He died in Newark, New Jersey on October 7, 1791, aged 60, and was interred in that city's First Presbyterian Church Cemetery.

Family
He married Mary Camp (1731–1781) and raised a large and successful family. Among his sons by his first wife Jacob Burnet was later a United States Senator from Ohio, while Ichabod and William, Jr. followed their father as doctors. With his second wife, Gertrude Gouverneur Rutgers, the widow of Anthony A. Rutgers (a brother of Henry Rutgers who founded Rutgers University), Burnet had three more sons. Isaac G. Burnet served as mayor of Cincinnati, and his youngest son, David Gouverneur Burnet, played a prominent role in Texas's struggle for independence.

References

External links

William Burnet at The Political Graveyard

 The Society of the Cincinnati
 The American Revolution Institute

1730 births
1791 deaths
Continental Army staff officers
Continental Congressmen from New Jersey
18th-century American politicians
Physicians from Newark, New Jersey
Politicians from Elizabeth, New Jersey
Politicians from Newark, New Jersey
People of New Jersey in the American Revolution
Physicians in the American Revolution
Princeton University alumni
Presidents of the Medical Society of New Jersey